Erodium botrys is a species of flowering plant in the geranium family known by the common names longbeak stork's bill, Mediterranean stork's-bill and broadleaf filaree.

Distribution
This is an annual herb which is native to much of Eurasia, the Mediterranean region, and North Africa.

It is found in many other areas of the world as a weedy  introduced species, including Australia, New Zealand, and parts of the Americas.

Description
Erodium botrys starts from a flat rosette of highly lobed green leaves on red petioles.

It bears small flowers with hairy, pointed sepals surrounding five purple-streaked lavender petals.

References

External links
Jepson Manual Treatment
Photo gallery

botrys
Flora of Europe
Flora of North Africa
Flora of Western Asia
Taxa named by Antonio José Cavanilles